WCED may refer to:

 Radio station WCED ("News/Talk 1420 WCED") in DuBois, Pennsylvania.
 The World Commission on Environment and Development, commonly known as the Brundtland Commission.
 The Western Cape Education Department, a government department in the Western Cape province of South Africa.
~